Phellinus lundellii is a species of fungus belonging to the family Hymenochaetaceae. It is found in Eurasia and North America.

References

lundellii
Fungi described in 1972
Fungi of Asia
Fungi of Europe
Fungi of North America